Bucsekia is a  genus of tiger moths in the family Erebidae.

Species
 Bucsekia mediumpilosa Bucsek, 2012
 Bucsekia yazakii (Dubatolov, Y. Kishida et M. Wang, 2012)

References

  & , 2012: Bucsekia gen. nov. - a new genus of lichen-moths from the Oriental region, with a review of the genus Microlithosia Daniel, 1954 (Lepidoptera, Arctiidae: Lithosiinae). Amurian Zoological Journal 4 (2): 177-180. Full article: .

Lithosiina
Moth genera